At least two ships of the Argentine Navy have been named ARA Moreno or ARA Mariano Moreno:

  was launched in 1903 but sold to Japan while still incomplete at the end of the Argentine–Chilean naval arms race, and renamed Nisshin. It was expended as a target ship in 1936 but was later raised and again expended as a target in 1942.
  was a  launched in 1911 and sold for scrap in 1957.

Argentine Navy ship names